The Medical Services Recruitment Board (MRB) was constituted by the Government of Tamil Nadu in G.O. (Ms) No.1, Health and Family Welfare (C2) Department dated 02.01.2012 with the objective of making appointments to various categories of staff in the Health and Family Welfare Department by way of direct recruitment, in a speedy manner, keeping in view  the nature, importance and essentiality of these posts.

Organisation 
The Medical Services Recruitment Board consists of a Chairman, a Member and a Member Secretary. Health and Family Welfare department Additional Secretary will head the Board. A person in the cadre equal to that of Medical department Deputy Director will be its Member and an officer equal to the ranks of District Revenue Officer will be appointed as its Member-Secretary.

Recruitment
MRB follows two types of direct recruitments:

1.Recruitment through Employment Exchange

2.Recruitment through Open Advertisement and Competitive Examination

See also
 Tamil Nadu Public Service Commission
 Tamil Nadu Uniformed Services Recruitment Board
 Tamil Nadu Forest Uniformed Services Recruitment Committee

References

External links
 
 TNPSC Login

State agencies of Tamil Nadu